1976–77 Yugoslav First League (Prva savezna liga Jugoslavije, Prvenstvo 1976/77) competition was the 49th top league season since 1923 in various incarnations of Yugoslavia. It was won in dominating fashion by Red Star Belgrade with a 9-point margin over the second placed team (Dinamo Zagreb), which at the time set the record as largest ever points differential by which a team triumphed in the league.

This was Red Star's 12th league title.

Teams
A total of eighteen teams contested the league, including sixteen sides from the 1975–76 season and two sides promoted from the 1975–76 Yugoslav Second League (YSL) as winners of the two second level divisions East and West. The league was contested in a double round robin format, with each club playing every other club twice, for a total of 34 rounds. Two points were awarded for wins and one point for draws.

FK Vardar and FK Radnički Kragujevac were relegated from the 1975–76 Yugoslav First League after finishing the season in bottom two places of the league table. The two clubs promoted to top level were NK Zagreb and FK Napredak Kruševac.

League table

Results

Winning squad

Top scorers

See also
1976–77 Yugoslav Cup
Yugoslav League Championship
Football Association of Yugoslavia

External links
Yugoslavia Domestic Football Full Tables

Yugoslav First League seasons
Yugo
1976–77 in Yugoslav football